The Anoia (Noya in Spanish) is a river in Catalonia, Spain, most of whose course is within the comarca of the same name. Its source is in the municipality of Veciana (Anoia) at 
It passes through Igualada and crosses the Prelitoral Range at Capellades. It 
then passes through Gelida (Alt Penedès) before joining the Llobregat from the right at 
Martorell (Baix Llobregat).

See also 
 List of rivers of Spain

References

Rivers of Spain
Rivers of Catalonia